Ab Chendar or Abchendar may refer to various places in Iran:
 Ab Chendar, Abezhdan, Khuzestan Province
 Ab Chendar, Chelo, Khuzestan Province
 Ab Chendaran (disambiguation), Kohgiluyeh and Boyer-Ahmad Province
 Ab Chendar, Boyer-Ahmad, Kohgiluyeh and Boyer-Ahmad Province
 Ab Chendar, Charusa, Kohgiluyeh and Boyer-Ahmad Province
 Ab Chendar, Landeh, Kohgiluyeh and Boyer-Ahmad Province

See also
 Ab Chenar (disambiguation)